The Cabal was, or perhaps is, a set of set theorists in Southern California, particularly at UCLA and Caltech, but also at UC Irvine.  Organization and procedures range from informal to nonexistent, so it is difficult to say whether it still exists or exactly who has been a member, but it has included such notable figures as Donald A. Martin, Yiannis N. Moschovakis, John R. Steel, and Alexander S. Kechris. Others who have published in the proceedings of the Cabal seminar include Robert M. Solovay, W. Hugh Woodin, Matthew Foreman, and Steve Jackson.

The work of the group is characterized by free use of large cardinal axioms, and research into the descriptive set theoretic behavior of sets of reals if such assumptions hold.

Publications

References
 
 

Descriptive set theory
Set theory